Alsophila borbonica, synonym Cyathea borbonica, is a tree fern endemic to Mauritius and Réunion. There are several natural forms and varieties.

Description

It reaches a height of roughly 2 meters, with a dark, hairy, scaly trunk. Its spreading leaves are dark green fronds. Each frond has a relatively small stem (stipe). Each leaf also divides only twice (bipinnate): 
 The central midrib of the frond (rachis) branches into many horizontal leaflets (pinnae).
 Each pinna midrib bears many small leaflets (pinnules).

Forms and distribution
There are two natural Mauritian varieties, which occur mainly in the upland forest in the higher parts of the island, and are both endangered. There is one natural Reunionese variety: 

 A. borbonica var. borbonica (Réunion)
 A. borbonica var. latifolia (Mauritius), which bears an umbrella-shaped crown
 A. borbonica var. sevathiana (Mauritius), which bears a funnel-shaped crown

Related species
In Mauritius, they share the island with several other tree ferns - the naturally occurring Mauritian species Alsophila grangaudiana and Alsophila celsa - and the alien non-indigenous Sphaeropteris cooperi which is introduced from its native Australia. 

In Réunion, they share the island with the naturally occurring Réunionese species Alsophila glaucifolia and Alsophila celsa - and also with the introduced Sphaeropteris cooperi. 

Alsophila borbonica can be distinguished from all of these other species by its small stipe and by its fronds' two-level division.

References

External links 

Flora of Réunion
Flora of Mauritius
borbonica
Plants described in 1811